Akhkend may refer to:
Akhkend, Armenia
Akhkend, Iran

See also
Aqkand (disambiguation)